Brussels is a village in southern Calhoun County, Illinois, United States. The population was 116 at the 2020 census.

General information
Brussels is the headquarters location of the Two Rivers National Wildlife Refuge, which is noted for its population of bald eagles.  The refuge is named after the two great rivers that flow together close to Brussels, the Illinois River and the Mississippi River.

Brussels has one school district, No. 42, which consists of one grade school (Brussels Grade School) and one high school (Brussels High School). The school district serves the surrounding communities of Meppen, Golden Eagle, and parts of Batchtown. In addition to the public school system, Brussels has a parochial grade school, St. Marys.  Brussels High School is small and its enrollment usually hovers at around 70 students.

History
Brussels was first settled in 1822, when John Mettz came to the area; later in the same year, Joshua Twitchell established the community's first business, a blacksmith shop. In 1843, Brussels' population grew significantly due to an influx of German immigrants. German immigration continued through the 1860s, and Irish immigrants also began settling in Brussels in the 1850s. The Wittmond Trading Post, one of the first brick stores in the region, opened in Brussels in 1847, marking the beginning of the village's commercial development. St. Mary's Church formed in 1848 to serve the community's Catholic residents; its current church building was constructed in 1863. In the early 1860s, St. Matthew's Church formed for Brussels' German Lutheran population. Brussels opened its own post office in 1875 and built its own jail in 1876. In 1888, Brussels was legally incorporated as a village.

The main street of the village is a historic district listed on the National Register of Historic Places.

Geography
Brussels is located at  (38.947275, -90.588630).

Demographics
As of the 2020 census there were 116 people, 36 households, and 17 families residing in the village. The racial makeup of the village was 93.97% White, 0.86% African American, 1.72% from other races, and 3.45% from two or more races. Hispanic or Latino of any race were 1.72% of the population.

There were 36 households, out of which 30.56% had children under the age of 18 living with them, 44.44% were married couples living together, 2.78% had a female householder with no husband present, and 52.78% were non-families. 52.78% of all households were made up of individuals, and 19.44% had someone living alone who was 65 years of age or older. The average household size was 4.47 and the average family size was 2.64.

The village's age distribution consisted of 9.7% under the age of 18, 6.2% from 18 to 24, 30.1% from 25 to 44, 34.5% from 45 to 64, and 19.5% who were 65 years of age or older. The median age was 48.5 years. For every 100 females, there were 63.8 males. For every 100 females age 18 and over, there were 56.9 males.

Males had a median income of $39,583 versus $19,844 for females. The per capita income for the village was $25,463. No families and 27.4% of the population were below the poverty line, including none of those under age 18 and 36.4% of those age 65 or over.

See also

 List of municipalities in Illinois

References

External links

Villages in Illinois
Villages in Calhoun County, Illinois
Populated places established in 1888
1888 establishments in Illinois